Epilobophora sabinata is a moth of the family Geometridae.

Subspecies
Subspecies include:
Epilobophora sabinata sabinata (Geyer, 1831)
Epilobophora sabinata teriolensis (Kitt, 1932)

Distribution
These moths can be found in mountain habitat, in sunny to partially shaded places, mainly in wasteland and open woodlands, in forests and other wooded areas, especially in high alpine valleys and subalpine conifer forests with large populations of the host plant.

Description
These moths are characterized by their brown color, with a darker brown transversal band.

Biology
Epilobophora sabinata is a single-brood species  (univoltine species. Adults fly at night from May to August. Caterpillars are monophagous, they feed on Juniperus sabina (hence the species name) and overwinter.

Bibliography
Guggemoos, T. (2016): Epilobophora sabinata ssp. teriolensis (Kitt, 1932) im Ammergebirge – Erstnachweis für Deutschland (Insecta: Lepidoptera: Geometridae). — Beiträge zur bayerischen Entomofaunistik 16: 15–18.
Hausmann A. & J. Viidalepp (2012): The Geometrid Moths of Europe - Volume 3: Apollo Books 507, Nr. 259
Hübner, J. [1790-1833]: Sammlung europäischer Schmetterlinge 5: pl. 1–113.
Schmid, J. (2007): Kritische Liste der Schmetterlinge Graubündens und ihrer geographischen Verbreitung. Grossschmetterlinge 'Macrolepidoptera'. Eigenverlag, Ilanz. 94pp 53
SwissLepTeam (2010): Die Schmetterlinge (Lepidoptera) der Schweiz: Eine kommentierte, systematisch-faunistische Liste.  Fauna Helvetica 25. Neuchâtel (CSCF & SEG) Nr. 8673
Viidalepp, J. & Hausmann, A. - The Geometrid Moths of Europe, vol. 3 (Larentiinae I). in Apollo Books, Stenstrup, 550 pp. & 24 colour pls. 2009
Vorbrodt, K. & Müller-Rutz, J. (1913-1914): Die Schmetterlinge der Schweiz. Band 2 (inkl. 2. Nachtrag) - Druck und Verlag K.J.Wyss, Bern 43, Nr. 914

External links
 MNHN & OFB [Ed]. 2003-2021. Sheet of Epilobophora sabinata (Geyer, 1831). Inventaire national du patrimoine naturel (INPN)
 Galerie-insecte
 Lepi’net
 Paolo Mazzei, Daniel Morel, Raniero Panfili Moths and Butterflies of Europe and North Africa

References

Trichopterygini
Moths described in 1831